M. Rony Francois is an American doctor, health administrator, and academic professor. He is currently the Director of the Georgia Division of Public Health. He previously served as Secretary of the Florida Department of Health under then Florida Governor Jeb Bush from 2005 to 2007.

Francois is an alumnus of the University of Central Florida and the University of South Florida. He earned his bachelor's degree and master's degree from UCF, where he was also a star on the Knights soccer team, and he graduated with his medical degree from South Florida in 1994.

References

Living people
American health officials
University of Central Florida alumni
University of South Florida alumni
Haitian emigrants to the United States
American politicians of Haitian descent
Georgia (U.S. state) Republicans
Year of birth missing (living people)
UCF Knights men's soccer players